Andefapony is a rural commune in the region of Fitovinany eastern Madagascar. It has a population of 5,053  inhabitants.

References

Populated places in Fitovinany